The Prix Femina étranger is a French literary award established in 1985. It is awarded annually to a foreign-language literary work translated into French.

List of laureates

See also 
 Prix Femina
 Prix Femina essai

References

French literary awards
Awards established in 1985
1985 establishments in France
International literary awards
Translation awards
French-language literary awards